

Josef Rintelen (7 March 1897 – 14 July 1981) was a German general during World War II. He was a recipient of the Knight's Cross of the Iron Cross of Nazi Germany.

Awards and decorations

 Knight's Cross of the Iron Cross on 5 August 1940 as Oberstleutnant and commander of I./Infanterie-Regiment 478

References

Citations

Bibliography

 

1897 births
1981 deaths
People from Rhein-Erft-Kreis
Lieutenant generals of the German Army (Wehrmacht)
People from the Rhine Province
German Army personnel of World War I
German police officers
Recipients of the clasp to the Iron Cross, 1st class
Recipients of the Gold German Cross
Recipients of the Knight's Cross of the Iron Cross
Military personnel from North Rhine-Westphalia
German Army generals of World War II